Brakefield Green is a village in Norfolk, England. The population is included in the civil parish of Whinburgh and Westfield.

External links

Villages in Norfolk
Breckland District